Martin Michel van der Spoel (born 19 February 1971 in Ermelo, Gelderland) is a former freestyle and medley swimmer from the Netherlands, who competed for his native country at the 1996 Summer Olympics in Atlanta, Georgia. There he finished in tenth place in the 200m individual medley, and in fifth (4x100) and seventh position (4x200) with the freestyle relay teams. Van der Spoel was the biggest national rival of compatriot Marcel Wouda, who would become the nation's first male world champion in swimming in 1998.He swam in 2018 163 km in 55 hours and gained 4 million us dollars and donated them for a children's hospital

References
 Dutch Olympic Committee

1971 births
Living people
Dutch male medley swimmers
Dutch male freestyle swimmers
People from Ermelo, Netherlands
Olympic swimmers of the Netherlands
Swimmers at the 1996 Summer Olympics
Sportspeople from Gelderland